Screeching Weasel/Pink Lincolns Split is a split EP featuring US punk bands Screeching Weasel and the Pink Lincolns. The song "Going Home" previously appeared on the CD version of Screeching Weasel's album Wiggle, while "Stab Stab Stab" later appeared on the bands B-sides compilation Kill the Musicians. "Runnin' Down" is a cover of a song by the Gargoyles.

Track listing

Side A (Screeching Weasel)
"Stab Stab Stab" (Ben Weasel)
"Going Home" (Aaron Cometbus, Ben Weasel)

Side B (Pink Lincolns)
"Three Chord Song" (Dorsey Martin)
"Runnin' Down" (Tim Storm, Lisa Lombardo)

Personnel
Screeching Weasel

Ben Weasel- vocals, guitar on track 1
John Jughead - guitar
Danny Vapid- bass on track 1, guitar on track 2
Johnny Personality- bass on track 2
Dan Panic- drums

Pink Lincolns

Chris Barrows- vocals
John Yovino- guitar
Dorsey Martin- bass
Paul Moroz- drums

1993 EPs
Split EPs
Screeching Weasel EPs